Mount Carbone is a mountain  east of Mount Paige in the Phillips Mountains, Marie Byrd Land, Antarctica, with an approximate elevation of 1060 m. It was discovered and mapped from air photos by the Byrd Antarctic Expedition (1928–30), and named by the Advisory Committee on Antarctic Names for Al Carbone, cook with the later Byrd Antarctic Expedition (1933–35).

References 

Mountains of Marie Byrd Land